The 2012–13 Moldovan National Division (Moldovan: Divizia Naţională) is the 22nd season of top-tier football in Moldova. The competition began on 13 July 2012 and ended in May 2013.

The league comprises 12 teams, 11 from the 2011–12 season and one promoted site from 2011–12 A Division. Sheriff Tiraspol are the defending champions.

Teams
CSCA–Rapid Chişinău and FC Costuleni were originally relegated on competitive grounds at the end of the 2011–12 season as they finished in the bottom two places of the league table. However, both clubs were eventually spared after Sfintul Gheorghe Suruceni did not obtain a National Division licence for 2012–13 and only one team, runners-up Speranţa Crihana Veche, could be promoted from the top four 2011–12 A Division sides on the same grounds.

In further changes, FC Academia UTM Chişinău were renamed FC Academia Chişinău.

Stadia and locations

Personnel and sponsorship

Promoted sides Speranţa Crihana Veche play their home matches in the nearby town of Cahul.

League table

Positions by round
The following table represents the teams position after each round in the competition.

Results
The schedule consists of three rounds. During the first two rounds, each team plays each other once home and away for a total of 22 matches. The pairings of the third round will then be set according to the standings after the first two rounds, giving every team a third game against each opponent for a total of 33 games per team.

First and second round

Third round
Key numbers for pairing determination (number marks position after 22 games):

Top goalscorers
Updated to matches played on 1 June 2013.

Hat-tricks

Clean sheets

Disciplinary
Final classification.

References

External links
 Official website

Moldovan Super Liga seasons
1
Moldova